Escobaria vivipara is a species of cactus known by several common names, including spinystar, viviparous foxtail cactus, pincushion cactus and ball cactus. It is native to North America, where certain varieties can be found from Mexico to Canada. Most of these varieties are limited to the Mojave and Sonoran Deserts. The species epithet "vivipara" is due to the species' viviparous reproductive habit.

Description

Varieties
Varieties include:
Escobaria vivipara var. arizonica (Arizona spinystar) – native to the desert southwest of the United States
Escobaria vivipara var. bisbeeana (Bisbee spinystar) – native to Arizona and New Mexico
Escobaria vivipara var. deserti (Desert spinystar) – found in the desert southwest
Escobaria vivipara var. kaibabensis (Kaibab spinystar) – mostly limited to Arizona
Escobaria vivipara var. neomexicana (New Mexico spinystar) – native to New Mexico and Texas
Escobaria vivipara var. vivipara – known as far north as Manitoba

Distribution
The species has a broad range across the western interior of North America, from northern Mexico to the Canadian prairies. Its distribution in the early Holocene era is known to have differed locally from its present range. From pollen core data, a portion of the prehistoric distribution of this species has been mapped; for example in the Late Wisconsin period, Escobaria vivipara occurred in the Waterman Mountains (Coconino County) of northern Arizona, (the Waterman Mountains are in SE Arizona), although the species does not occur in this location in the present time.

In the US state of Minnesota, it is listed as a threatened species and is at the most easterly extent of its natural range; it is rare in the state and found in a narrow section of the western part of the state, where it is found growing in crevices and outcroppings of granite.  It consists of one population that in the past was recorded by Lycurgus Moyer, who found it in 1898, as "quite abundant", but because of habitat loss due to farming, its numbers have declined. The remaining plants are also threatened by illegal harvesting by cactus fanciers, who plant it in rock gardens and windowsills.

Notably, Escobaria vivipara is one of only four cactus species native to Canada, growing in the southern prairies of Alberta, Saskatchewan and  southwestern Manitoba.

Notes

References
 C. Michael Hogan. 2009. Elephant Tree: Bursera microphylla, GlobalTwitcher.com, ed. N. Stromberg
 Jepson Manual. 1993. Escobaria vivipara. University of California, Berkeley
 U.S. Department of Agriculture (USDA). 2009. USDA: Escobaria vivipara

External links

Jepson Manual Treatment of Escobaria vivipara
USDA Plants Profile for Escobaria vivipara (spinystar)
Escobaria vivipara — U.C. Photo gallery

vivipara
Cacti of Canada
Cacti of Mexico
Cacti of the United States
Flora of the Western United States
Flora of Northwestern Mexico
Flora of Northeastern Mexico
Flora of Western Canada
Flora of the Great Plains (North America)
North American desert flora
Flora of the California desert regions
Flora of the Sonoran Deserts
Flora of the Chihuahuan Desert
Flora of the Great Basin
Natural history of the Lower Colorado River Valley
Natural history of the Mojave Desert
Flora without expected TNC conservation status